Timothy William Roberts (born 4 March 1978) is an English former cricketer who represented Lancashire and Northamptonshire. Roberts was a right-handed batsman who bowled right-arm off break.

Personal
Roberts studied at Durham University, where he played for the cricket team and was also selected for British Universities.

Career
After a brief spell at Lancashire playing only four first-class games, he moved to Northamptonshire for two years scoring over 1000 first-class runs and scoring a best one day score of 131 against Nottinghamshire. While at Northamptonshire, he played regularly for Finedon Dolben and continued until the end of the 2009 season.

References

External links

1978 births
Living people
English cricketers
Lancashire cricketers
Northamptonshire cricketers
Bedfordshire cricketers
Sportspeople from Kettering
British Universities cricketers
Alumni of Durham University